Kansar (Also known as Lapsi) is a sweet dessert from Gujarat, India, whose main ingredients are whole wheat flour or broken wheat, sugar powder and clarified butter. Serving Kansar to guests is considered a sign of respect in Gujarati culture, and the dish plays a part in traditional wedding ceremonies and every happy occasion.

See also
 List of desserts

References 

Gujarati cuisine
Indian desserts
Wheat dishes